Datheosaurus is an extinct genus of caseasaur. It was at least  in length. It lived during the Latest Carboniferous to Early Permian in Poland.

Discovery and history
It was originally described in 1905 on a basis of a specimen from late Carboniferous deposits in Poland. It was later considered a synonym of Haptodus by several authors, but subsequent examination has found it be a caseid rather a sphenacodont. This was confirmed by cladistic analysis, which recovered Datheosaurus as a basal caseid

References

Caseasaurs
Prehistoric synapsid genera
Carboniferous synapsids
Cisuralian synapsids of Europe
Fossil taxa described in 1904